Beach volleyball is an optional sport at the quadrennial Commonwealth Games. It first appeared at the 2018 Games with both men's and women's contests. It is scheduled to be held for the second time at the 2022 Games and a third time at the 2026 Games.

Venues 
  Gold Coast 2018: Coolangatta Beachfront
  Birmingham 2022: Smithfield, Birmingham

Men's tournament

Results

Performance by nation

Legend

GP – Group stage / First round
QF – Quarter Finals
Q – The team has qualified for the tournament.
TBD – Qualification ongoing; can still qualify.

Women's tournament

Results

Performance by nation

Legend

GP – Group stage / First round
QF – Quarter Finals
Q – The team has qualified for the tournament.
TBD – Qualification ongoing; can still qualify.

All-time medal table

See also
 Beach volleyball at the Summer Olympics

References

 
Sports at the Commonwealth Games
Commonwealth Games